Charles Salim Stoudamire (born October 11, 1982) is an American former professional basketball player.

Stoudamire was selected by the Atlanta Hawks in the second round (31st overall pick) of the 2005 NBA draft.

Early life and college
Stoudamire graduated from Lake Oswego High School in Lake Oswego, Oregon as a member of the class of 2001.  He also attended Lincoln High School in Portland during his freshman year.

At the University of Arizona, Stoudamire led the Wildcats to an Elite Eight appearance in 2005. Stoudamire hit a fadeaway shot with less than two seconds on the clock to beat Oklahoma State University in the Sweet 16. In his Arizona career, the guard made 342 three-point field goals. He ranks second in Arizona history in career three-point field goal percentage (45.8%, behind Steve Kerr's 57.3%).

With the University of Arizona Wildcats, in the 2004–05 season, Stoudamire was an AP Second Team All-American.
In 2004–05, Stoudamire led the NCAA in 3-point percentage, averaging .504.

Professional career
Stoudamire was drafted by the Atlanta Hawks with the 31st overall pick in the 2005 NBA draft. Stoudamire played three seasons with the Hawks. On March 24, 2007, he scored a career-high 37 points during a 102-100 overtime loss to the Portland Trail Blazers. He spent the 2008 preseason with the San Antonio Spurs and 2009 preseason with the Milwaukee Bucks.

On November 1, 2010, Stoudamire was acquired by the Idaho Stampede; he was later waived on December 30. On January 5, 2011, he was acquired by the Reno Bighorns.

On November 1, 2013, Stoudamire was acquired by the Fort Wayne Mad Ants. Stoudamire was later waived by the Mad Ants on November 12.

In 2018, Stoudamire was drafted to The 3 Headed Monsters team on Ice Cube’s Big 3 tournament, which aired on Fox on June 21, 2018 and continued until the championship in Brooklyn, NY on August 24, 2018.

Personal life
Stoudamire is the cousin of former NBA players Damon Stoudamire and Terrence Jones, and current NBA player Grant Williams.

In 2006, after the end of the NBA season, Stoudamire announced his intentions to eat vegan. After initially monitoring his health daily, team staff accepted that the new diet had not caused weight loss.

NBA career statistics

Regular season

|-
| align="left" | 
| align="left" | Atlanta
| 61 || 1 || 20.3 || .415 || .380 || .900 || 1.9 || 1.2 || .4 || .0 || 9.7
|-
| align="left" | 
| align="left" | Atlanta
| 61 || 0 || 17.0 || .416 || .361 || .897 || 1.2 || 1.0 || .3 || .0 || 7.7
|-
| align="left" | 
| align="left" | Atlanta
| 35 || 0 || 11.5 || .361 || .341 || .820 || .7 || .8 || .2 || .1 || 5.7
|-
| align="left" | Career
| align="left" | 
| 157 || 1 || 17.0 || .407 || .366 || .882 || 1.4 || 1.0 || .4 || .1 || 8.0

Playoffs

|-
| align="left" | 2008
| align="left" | Atlanta
| 3 || 0 || 9.3 || .444 || .333 || 1.000 || .3 || .0 || .3 || .0 || 4.0
|-
| align="left" | Career
| align="left" | 
| 3 || 0 || 9.3 || .444 || .333 || 1.000 || .3 || .0 || .3 || .0 || 4.0

References

External links

Official website for Salim Stoudamire 

1982 births
Living people
21st-century African-American sportspeople
African-American basketball players
All-American college men's basketball players
American expatriate basketball people in Venezuela
American men's basketball players
Atlanta Hawks draft picks
Arizona Wildcats men's basketball players
Basketball players from Portland, Oregon
Big3 players
Guaros de Lara (basketball) players
Idaho Stampede players
Lake Oswego High School alumni
Lincoln High School (Portland, Oregon) alumni
Point guards
Reno Bighorns players
Shooting guards
Sportspeople from Lake Oswego, Oregon
20th-century African-American people
American men's 3x3 basketball players